Sandra Brazauskaitė (born 3 August 1964) is a Lithuanian rower. She competed in the women's eight event at the 1988 Summer Olympics.

References

1964 births
Living people
Lithuanian female rowers
Olympic rowers of the Soviet Union
Rowers at the 1988 Summer Olympics